Hert or HERT may refer to:

 Headquarters Emergency Relocation Team
 Tami Hert, an R&B singer
 Hert (grape), a synonym of the Gros Verdot red French wine grape variety

See also 

 Herts, an abbreviation for Hertfordshire
 Hertsi, a shopping centre in Herttoniemi, Helsinki, Finland
 Hertz